Public demonstrations are rare in Singapore due to laws that make it illegal to hold cause-related events without a valid licence from the authorities. Such laws include the Public Entertainments Act and the Public Order Act.

Speaker's Corner

In the past, political speeches in Singapore were only permitted at the Speaker's Corner, an area created and designated for such events. However, a police permit was still a requirement before one could proceed with one's speech.

On 1 September 2008, the government decided that Singapore citizens wishing to hold events there need not obtain a permit from the police, and the restriction on using audio amplification devices was lifted. However, they are still required to register with the National Parks Board, a statutory body that manages nature parks.

In 2008, Speakers' Corner was the scene for meetings held over several weeks by Tan Kin Lian, former chief executive of insurance company NTUC Income, to advise people of their legal recourse after structured products they had purchased became virtually valueless upon the collapse of Lehman Brothers.

In 2010, following the closure of the beauty parlours Wax in the city, True Spa and Subtle Senses, members of the public gathered in the Speaker's corner to protest against the loss of fees paid to the spas. Customers of True Spa and Subtle Senses had made advance payments to businesses, only to find out days later that the spas had ceased operations.

Notable incidents
Nevertheless, such laws did not deter some groups conducting a number of illegal public demonstrations.

2009

Aung San Suu Kyi

On 18 March 2009, three activists held a demonstration at the Botanic Gardens to denounce the visit by Myanmar's PM and Junta leader Thein Sein, in which an orchid was named after him. The protestors also paid tribute to Aung San Suu Kyi by presenting a bunch of orchids on her behalf at the Myanmar Embassy.

Deportation of Myanmar Nationals

On 12 January 2009, two Singaporeans staged a protest outside the Ministry of Manpower (MOM) building to voice their disapproval over the treatment of two Myanmar nationals who had their work permits cancelled. It was alleged that the Singapore government refused to allow them to continue working because they were involved in Myanmar pro-democracy movement. The two activists were arrested but released on bail later. As of present, no charges have been laid yet.

2008

Tak Boleh Tahan

A group of 20 people turned up at Parliament House on 15 March 2008 to protest against the escalating cost of living in Singapore. Tak Boleh Tahan stands for "I can't take it anymore" in colloquial Malay. The event was organised by the SDP and included their members. 18 were arrested when they refused to disperse as ordered by the police. All 20 were subsequently charged under Section 5(4)b Chapter 184 of the Miscellaneous Offences (Public and Nuisance) Act. The Singapore Police Force described this incident as an escalation on the scale and level of defiance exhibited by the group and stated that their actions and arm-locking with each other was "militant like".

Recent changes
The Public Order Act gives authorities the power to prevent an individual from leaving home or a building if it is deemed that that person intended or intends to be part of a demonstration. Police are also allowed to order a person to leave a specific area should they determine an intention of offence. Second Home Affairs Minister K. Shanmugam argues that this was necessary to maintain security at the Asia-Pacific Economic Cooperation summit held in 2009. However, opponents like Chee Soon Juan, leader of the Singapore Democratic Party argues that the law is intended  "for the long run"  to silence discontent against the government.

See also
 Human rights in Singapore
 Censorship in Singapore
 Demonstration (protest)

References

Freedom of assembly in Singapore
Freedom of expression in Singapore
Politics of Singapore